Traveller Supplement Adventure 6: Expedition to Zhodane is a 1981 role-playing game adventure for Traveller published by Game Designers' Workshop.

Plot summary
Expedition to Zhodane is an adventure that concerns an expedition into Zhodani space within the Chronor subsector of the Spinward Marches.

Reception
William A. Barton reviewed Expedition to Zhodane in The Space Gamer No. 47. Barton commented that "while not as exciting as a situation as, say, Twilight's Peak was, Expedition to Zhodane should prove sufficient for several sessions of intriguing Traveller play."

Reviews
 Different Worlds #44 (Nov./Dec., 1986)

References

Role-playing game supplements introduced in 1981
Traveller (role-playing game) adventures